Ariel Edgardo Torrado Mosconi (January 18, 1961) is a prelate of the Roman Catholic Church. He has served as Auxiliary Bishop of Santiago del Estero since his appointment by Pope Emeritus Benedict XVI on November 22, 2008. On Tuesday December, 1, 2015, Pope Francis appointed him Bishop of the Roman Catholic Diocese of Nueve de Julio.

Life 
Born in Veinticinco de Mayo, Torrado Mosconi was ordained to the priesthood on November 17, 1990, for the archdiocese of Buenos Aires.

On November 22, 2008, he was appointed Auxiliary Bishop of Santiago del Estero and Titular Bishop of Vicus Pacati by then-Pope Benedict XVI. Torrado Mosconi received his episcopal consecration on the following December 13 from then-Cardinal Jorge Mario Bergoglio, S.J., Archbishop of Buenos Aires and Primate of Argentina, the future Pope Francis, with the then-Bishop of Santiago del Estero, Francisco Polti Santillán, and the Auxiliary Bishop of La Plata, Antonio Marino, serving as co-consecrators.

References

External links 

 catholic-hierarchy.org, Bishop Ariel Edgardo Torrado Mosconi

1961 births
21st-century Roman Catholic bishops in Argentina
Living people
Roman Catholic bishops of Nueve de Julio
Roman Catholic bishops of Santiago del Estero
Bishops appointed by Pope Francis